Trans World Airlines Flight 847 was a flight from Cairo to San Diego with en route stops in Athens, Rome, Boston, and Los Angeles. On the morning of June 14, 1985, Flight 847 was hijacked shortly after take off from Athens. The hijackers demanded the release of 700 Shia Muslims from Israeli custody and took the plane repeatedly to Beirut and Algiers. Later Western analysis considered them members of the Hezbollah group, an allegation Hezbollah rejects.

The passengers and crew endured a three-day intercontinental ordeal. Some passengers were threatened and some beaten. Passengers with Jewish-sounding names were separated from the others. United States Navy diver Robert Stethem was murdered, and his body was thrown onto the apron. Dozens of passengers were held hostage over the next two weeks until released by their captors after some of their demands were met.

Hijacking events 
Flight 847 was operated with a Boeing 727-200, registration  The flight originated in Cairo on the morning of June 14. After an uneventful flight from Cairo to Athens, a new crew boarded Flight 847. The new crew in Athens were Captain John Testrake, First Officer Phil Maresca, Flight Engineer Christian Zimmerman, flight service manager Uli Derickson, and flight attendants Judy Cox, Hazel Hesp, Elizabeth Howes, and Helen Sheahan.

At 10:10, Flight 847 departed Athens for Rome. It was hijacked shortly after takeoff by two Arabic-speaking Lebanese men who had smuggled a pistol and two grenades through the Athens airport security. One was later identified as Mohammed Ali Hamadi, who was eventually captured and sentenced to life imprisonment in Germany. Hamadi is an alleged member of Hezbollah. 

The hijackers assaulted Derickson, breaching the cockpit and dragging her with them before attacking and pistol-whipping Testrake, Maresca, and Zimmerman.

To Beirut, then Algiers 

With Captain Testrake being held at gunpoint, the plane was diverted from its original destination of Rome, in airspace over Greece, to the Middle East and made its first stop, for several hours, at the Beirut International Airport in Lebanon, where 19 passengers were allowed to leave in exchange for fuel. Shortly before landing, air traffic control initially refused to let them land in Beirut. Captain Testrake argued with air traffic control until they relented. He said at one point, "He has pulled a hand-grenade pin and he is ready to blow up the aircraft if he has to. We must, I repeat, we must land at Beirut. We must land at Beirut. No alternative."

At the time, Lebanon was in the midst of the Lebanese Civil War, and Beirut was divided into sectors controlled by different Shia Amal militia and Hezbollah. That afternoon, the aircraft continued on across the Mediterranean to Algiers, where 20 passengers were released during a five-hour stop before heading back to Beirut that night.

Back to Beirut 

Beirut International Airport was surrounded by a Shia neighborhood. It had no perimeter security and had been overrun by Islamist militias, and nearby residents could simply drive onto the runway.

The hijackers had systematically and regularly beaten all the military passengers, but during this stop, they selected U.S. Navy diver, Robert Stethem, beat him, shot him in the right temple, and dumped his body out of the plane onto the ramp and shot him again, seeking permission from other Shia Muslims operating the control tower to obtain more fuel. Seven American passengers, alleged to have Jewish-sounding surnames, were taken off the jet and held hostage in a Shia prison in Beirut.

Algiers, Beirut again 
Nearly a dozen heavily armed men joined the hijackers before the plane returned to Algiers the following day, 15 June, where an additional 65 passengers and all five female cabin crew members were released.

The initial demands of the hijackers included:
 Release of the "Kuwait 17", those involved in the 1983 bombing of the U.S. embassy in Kuwait 
 Release of all 766 mainly Lebanese Shias transferred to Israel's Atleat Prison in conjunction with immediate withdrawal of Israeli forces from southern Lebanon
 International condemnation of Israel and the United States

The Greek government released the accomplice, Ali Atwa, and in exchange the hijackers released eight Greek citizens, including Greek pop singer Demis Roussos, to be flown by a Greek government business jet from Algiers back to Athens.

By the afternoon of June 17, the 40 remaining hostages had been taken from the plane and held hostage throughout Beirut by Hezbollah. Nabih Berri was the chief of the Amal militia and the minister of justice in the fractured Lebanon cabinet. One of the hostages was released when he developed heart trouble. The other 39 remained captive until June 30 when they were collected in a local schoolyard after an intervention by U.S. President Ronald Reagan along with Lebanese officials. The released hostages then met with international journalists and were driven to Syria by the International Red Cross to the Sheraton Hotel and a press conference in Damascus.

The hostages then boarded a U.S. Air Force C-141B Starlifter cargo plane and flew to Rhein-Main AB, Hesse, West Germany, where they were met by U.S. Vice President George H. W. Bush, debriefed, given medical examinations, then flown to Andrews Air Force Base in Maryland and welcomed home by the president. Over the next several weeks, Israel released over 700 Shia prisoners, while maintaining that the prisoners' release was not related to the hijacking.

Aftermath 

The iconic image of this hijacking was a photograph showing a gun being held to Captain Testrake's head, sticking out of the cockpit window, while he and the other pilots were being interviewed by ABC News reporter Charles Glass. The scene was interrupted by one of the French-speaking Hezbollah guards left by the hijackers to hold the crew after most passengers and the cabin crew had been released in Algiers, and the remaining men were held in captivity elsewhere in Beirut. The young militiaman may have unloaded the gun before crashing the scene, as he primarily wanted to be on television.

Flight attendant Uli Derickson was credited with calming one of the hijackers during a fuel-quantity incident during the first leg to Beirut, because she spoke German, the only European language which either hijacker spoke. Notably, she interrupted an attempt to end the hijacking in Algiers when airport officials refused to refuel the plane without payment by offering her own Shell Oil credit card, which was used to charge about $5,500 for 22,700 L (6,000 gal) of jet fuel, for which she was reimbursed. She also refused to cooperate with the hijackers in identifying for them the passports of any passengers with Jewish-sounding names so they could not be singled out.

, an  commissioned in 1995, was named in honor of Robert Stethem. The aircraft involved in the hijacking was put back into service. It remained in service for TWA until the aircraft was retired on September 30, 2000. It ceremoniously operated the airline's final revenue flight of their Boeing 727 fleet. The aircraft was later scrapped in May 2002. It had first flown on August 27, 1974, and was delivered to the airline on September 5, 1974.

Alleged perpetrators 
Hezbollah specialist Magnus Ranstorp of the University of St Andrews credits "leading" Hezbollah members Hassan Izz-Al-Din (later involved in the Kuwait Airways Flight 422 hijacking in 1988) and Mohammed Ali Hammadi, whose brother was one of the heads of the Hezbollah Special Security Apparatus, with assisting Hezbollah operatives in the "supervision and planning of the incident itself and as an active participant in the defusion and resolution."

On October 10, 2001, in the immediate aftermath of 9/11, three of the alleged hijackers, Imad Mughniyeh, Ali Atwa, and Hassan Izz-Al-Din, having been earlier indicted in United States district courts for the 1985 skyjacking of the American airliner, were among the original 22 fugitives announced by President George W. Bush to be placed on the newly formed FBI Most Wanted Terrorists list. Rewards of $5 million for information leading to the arrest and conviction of Atwa and Izz-Al-Din are still being offered by the United States.

Mohammed Ali Hammadi was arrested in 1987 in Frankfurt, West Germany, while attempting to smuggle liquid explosives, two years after the TWA Flight 847 attack. In addition to the West German charge of illegal importation of explosives, he was tried and convicted of Stethem's 1985 murder and was sentenced to life in prison. However, he was paroled and released by German officials on December 20, 2005, and returned to Lebanon. There has been speculation that his parole was granted as part of a covert prisoner swap, in exchange for the release of Susanne Osthoff. Taken hostage in Iraq a month prior, Osthoff was released the week of Hammadi's parole. On February 14, 2006 the United States formally asked the Lebanese government to extradite Mohammed Ali Hammadi for Stethem's murder. On February 24, 2006, he appeared as well on the FBI Most Wanted Terrorists list, under the name Mohammed Ali "Hamadei" (sic). He was among the second group of indicted fugitives to be named by the FBI to the list.

Several news outlets reported the announcement by Hezbollah of the death of Imad Mughniyeh in a car bomb explosion in Syria on February 13, 2008. The remaining three fugitives from TWA Flight 847 remain on the list, and at large.

On September 19, 2019, Greek police arrested a 65-year-old Lebanese man who was accused of involvement in the hijacking. The man was arrested at Mykonos during a passport check for cruise ship passengers. He was aboard a cruise ship that had crossed Rhodes, Santorini and Mykonos. Mykonos was the last stop before returning to Turkey. He was later released after police determined it was a case of mistaken identity.

Hezbollah reportedly denies culpability in the TWA Flight 847 hijacking, among its denials of numerous other attacks that have been attributed to the group.

Film
The Delta Force film of 1986 is based on the TWA 847 hijacking.
The Taking of Flight 847: The Uli Derickson Story is a 1988 TV movie based on the incident focusing on the role of flight attendant Uli Derickson (played by Lindsay Wagner).

See also
Trans World Airlines Flight 106

References

External links 
 FBI Most Wanted Terrorists at fbi.gov web site
 Top Hezbollah militant slain
 John Testrake, 68, TWA pilot who became hero in hijacking

1985 in Algeria
1980s crimes in Beirut
1980s in Athens
1980s in Cairo
1985 murders in Lebanon
20th century in Algiers
Aircraft hijackings in Africa
Accidents and incidents involving the Boeing 727
Aircraft hijackings in Asia
Aircraft hijackings in Europe
Aviation accidents and incidents in 1985
Aviation accidents and incidents in Algeria
Aviation accidents and incidents in Greece
Aviation accidents and incidents in Lebanon
Crime in Algiers
Hezbollah attacks
Hostage taking in Algeria
Hostage taking in Europe
Hostage taking in Lebanon
June 1985 crimes
June 1985 events in Asia
June 1985 events in Europe
Lebanon–United States relations
Murder in Beirut
South Lebanon conflict (1985–2000)
Terrorist incidents in Algeria
Terrorist incidents in Asia in 1985
Terrorist incidents in Beirut
Terrorist incidents in Greece in the 1980s
Terrorist incidents in Lebanon in 1985
847